Conchita Martínez and Larisa Savchenko were the defending champions but did not compete that year.

Laura Golarsa and Natalia Medvedeva won in the final 6–3, 6–1 against Jenny Byrne and Rachel McQuillan.

Seeds
Champion seeds are indicated in bold text while text in italics indicates the round in which those seeds were eliminated. The top four seeded teams received byes into the second round.

Draw

Final

Top half

Bottom half

External links
 1994 Danone Hardcourt Championships Doubles Draw

1994 Doubles
1994 WTA Tour
1994 in Australian tennis